Kathleen Anne Brien (born 8 May 1989), better known as Katy B, is an English singer and songwriter. She released her debut studio album, On a Mission, in 2011, which spawned two top five hits, "Katy on a Mission" and "Lights On". In 2014 she released her second studio album, Little Red, which produced her third top five hit, "Crying for No Reason". Her third, and most recent, studio album, Honey, was released in 2016.

Early life
Kathleen Anne Brien was born on 8 May 1989, in Peckham, London, where she attended at Lyndhurst Primary School, Haberdashers' Aske's Hatcham College, and the BRIT School. Katy also attended at the Glenlyn Academy in South London, where she took dance classes. Katy's father (David O'Brien) was a member of the Les Humphries Singers, who represented Germany at Eurovision 1976, with the song "Sing Sang Song".
Katy B possesses a soprano vocal range.

Career

2007–2012: On a Mission

Katy has guested on many tracks, both before and during her album release campaign. DJ NG's song "Tell Me", on which she featured as Baby Katy, was initially released on a white label and then later signed to Ministry of Sound. She also provided vocals on the track "Hold Me" for The Count & Sinden's debut album Mega Mega Mega, and features on Magnetic Man's tracks "Perfect Stranger" and "Crossover".

Katy B has also collaborated with Rinse FM DJ Geeneus to cover the Kevin Saunderson produced "Good Life" and the track "As I". It was following the official recognition of the former pirate radio station Rinse FM in June 2010 that Katy B saw her first single release: "Katy on a Mission", presented by Rinse and produced by Benga, was released on 22 August 2010. The single reached number five on the UK Singles Chart and number one on the UK Indie Chart.

Katy B performed at the London Jazz Festival in 2009 with Ms Dynamite, who also featured on Katy's second single "Lights On", which was released in the United Kingdom on 19 December 2010, and debuted at number four on the UK Singles Chart. Her third single "Broken Record" was released in March 2011, and peaked at number eight. The fourth single "Easy Please Me" was released on 3 June 2011. Her fifth single "Witches' Brew" was released on 28 August 2011. Katy's debut album On a Mission was released on 4 April 2011, and peaked at number two on the UK Albums Chart.

Katy B supported Tinie Tempah on his tour during Spring of 2011, and on 30 April 2011 she embarked on her own debut concert tour throughout Europe until September, then the UK in October. In 2011, Katy B and Mark Ronson teamed up for the song "Anywhere in the World", which was created as an advert for Coca-Cola to tie in with the 2012 Summer Olympics, and was released as a digital download on 13 May 2012.

2013–2014: Little Red

On 1 October 2013, Katy announced that her second studio album would be titled Little Red. A single, "What Love Is Made Of", was released on 7 July 2013, charting at number 21 on the UK Singles Chart; although 
when the official Little Red track list was revealed on 13 December, "What Love Is Made Of" was no longer included. Lead single "5 AM" was released on 4 November 2013, charting at number 14 on the UK Singles Chart.  "Crying for No Reason" was released on 10 February 2014, reaching the Top 5 of the singles chart. Little Red topped the UK Albums Chart on 19 February 2014. "Still" was released as the third and final single from the album.

On 18 February 2014, Katy's video for the ongoing 'Rinse Sessions x Metropolis' project was revealed, which included a back-to-back cover of Beyoncé's 'Drunk in Love' and Tinashe's "Vulnerable". In February, she also appeared on the BBC One show The Voice as Ricky Wilson's team mentor.

In March 2014, Katy took part in the recording of England's 2014 World Cup song, collaborating with fellow pop stars Melanie C, Eliza Doolittle, Emma Bunton, Conor Maynard, Kimberley Walsh and Pixie Lott on "Greatest Day", a track originally performed by the British band Take That. The track was produced by Gary Barlow and recorded at Sarm Studios in London, and also featured former footballers such as Gary Lineker, Michael Owen, Geoff Hurst, David Seaman, Peter Shilton, Glenn Hoddle and Dion Dublin on backing vocals. She performed at Birmingham Pride in May 2014.

2015–present: Honey
In October 2015, Katy provided vocals, along with Tinie Tempah on "Turn the Music Louder (Rumble)", a re-worked version of British DJ KDA's track "Rumble". It topped the UK charts becoming Katy's first UK number one single.

In December 2015, Katy confirmed in a backstage interview at Capital FM's Jingle Bell Ball that her third studio album would be called Honey and would be released sometime in 2016. It was also confirmed that a track of the same name would feature. The album was released on 22 April 2016, containing 14 songs.

On 5 August 2021, Katy announced "Under My Skin" as the lead single from her EP, Peace and Offerings.

Katy released Peace and Offerings on 5 November 2021.

Katy is rumoured to be working on her next studio album and snippets have been shared from other various artists who she has been collaborating with confirming that she is back with a lot more music.

Political views
In November 2019, along with 34 other musicians, Katy signed a letter endorsing the Labour Party leader Jeremy Corbyn in the 2019 UK general election with a call to end austerity.

Discography

Studio albums
 On a Mission (2011)
 Little Red (2014)
 Honey (2016)

Tours
 On a Mission Tour (2011)
 Little Red UK Tour (2014)
 Honey Tour (2016)

Awards and nominations
Katy B has received five nominations at the MOBO Awards. She was nominated for Best Push Act at the MTV Europe Music Awards 2011. In 2011 she was also nominated for the Mercury Prize. In 2012 she won a NME Award for Dancefloor Anthem.

References

External links

Official site 

1989 births
Living people
Alumni of Goldsmiths, University of London
English dance musicians
English women singers
English songwriters
English sopranos
English women rappers
British contemporary R&B singers
Dubstep musicians
NME Awards winners
People educated at the BRIT School
People from Peckham
Rappers from London
Singers from London
UK garage singers
English women in electronic music
Columbia Records artists